Simon Grotelüschen (born 3 October 1986 in Lübeck) is a German sailor, who competes in the Laser class. He finished sixth at the 2012 Summer Olympics.

References

External links 

German male sailors (sport)
Sportspeople from Lübeck
1986 births
Living people
Sailors at the 2012 Summer Olympics – Laser
Olympic sailors of Germany